Lilab (also Romanized as Līlāb; also known as Līlān and Lilyan) is a village in Dizmar-e Markazi Rural District of Kharvana District, Varzaqan County, East Azerbaijan province, Iran. At the 2006 National Census, its population was 591 in 130 households. The following census in 2011 counted 569 people in 160 households. The latest census in 2016 showed a population of 764 people in 227 households; it was the largest village in its rural district.

References 

Varzaqan County

Populated places in East Azerbaijan Province

Populated places in Varzaqan County